The Bumblebeez (previously known as Bumblebeez 81) is an Australian indie band, formed by Christopher Colonna and his sister Pia Colonna (AKA Queen ViLa). The band's music has been described as a, "cut'n'paste collision of noisy hip-hop and rock." Their full-length debut album was Prince Umberto & The Sister of Ill, released in 2007.

History
The band was formed by Christopher Colonna and his sister, Pia, of Braidwood, New South Wales. The band was unearthed by the Australian radio station Triple J in 2002. Around the same time, they won a competition run by the ABC's short-lived Fly TV, making them the first to sign to the Fly Records label. In 2004, The Bumblebeez served as opener for Radiohead in Melbourne and Sydney.

The band released White Printz and Red Printz EP's, before compiling them into one album called The Printz for release in 2004. 

The band released their first full-length albumPrince Umberto and the Sister of Ill in September 2007, featuring the singles "Dr. Love" and "Rio". The album was selected as Triple J's "feature album," and nominated for a J Award on 28 November 2007. The album was mixed by Zdar of the French band Cassius.  
In May 2011, the EP I'm a Cowboi was released.

Their new single "Summer Bum" was premiered by Richard Kingsmill on his '2011' triple j show on Sunday 18 September.

Discography

Albums

Compilation albums

Extended plays

Charting singles

Awards and nominations

APRA Awards
The APRA Awards are presented annually from 1982 by the Australasian Performing Right Association (APRA), "honouring composers and songwriters". They commenced in 1982.

! 
|-
| 2008 
| "Dr Love" (Christopher Colonna, Pia Colonna)
| Urban Work of the Year
| 
| 
|-

J Award
The J Awards are an annual series of Australian music awards that were established by the Australian Broadcasting Corporation's youth-focused radio station Triple J. They commenced in 2005.

|-
| J Awards of 2007
|Prince Umberto and the Sister of Ill
| Australian Album of the Year
|

References

Australian hip hop groups
Australian indie rock groups
New South Wales musical groups
Wichita Recordings artists